Miriam Frenken (born 1984 in Düsseldorf) is a German sprint canoer who has competed since the mid-2000s. She won a silver medal in the K-4 1000 m event at the 2006 ICF Canoe Sprint World Championships in Szeged.

References

German female canoeists
Living people
1984 births
ICF Canoe Sprint World Championships medalists in kayak
Sportspeople from Düsseldorf
21st-century German women